Rhiwargor is a hamlet in Powys, Wales. It is located north of Lake Vyrnwy. The hamlet is made up of a few houses with no amenities. It does however, lie next to Rhiwagor Waterfall. The hamlet's nearest church is St Wddyn Church which is near Vyrnwy Dam. The nearest shop is also near Lake Vyrnwy Dam. The bus stop is at Abertridwr.

Climate

References

External links
People's collection
My Life Outside
View Ranger
Dafarnnewydd Stores

Villages in Powys